The 118th Massachusetts General Court, consisting of the Massachusetts Senate and the Massachusetts House of Representatives, met in 1897 during the governorship of Roger Wolcott. George P. Lawrence served as president of the Senate and John L. Bates served as speaker of the House.

The 1897 legislature is the high-water mark for the Massachusetts Republican Party, which held 35 seats in the Senate and 202 in the House. Republicans have not surpassed either number since, though they would match their high of 35 Senate seats again in 1920.

Senators

Representatives

See also
 55th United States Congress
 List of Massachusetts General Courts

References

Further reading

External links
 
 
 

Political history of Massachusetts
Massachusetts legislative sessions
massachusetts
1897 in Massachusetts